The year 1918 was marked, in science fiction, by the following events.

Births and deaths

Births 
 January 26 : Philip José Farmer, American writer (died 2009)
 February 26 : Theodore Sturgeon, American writer (died 1985)

Deaths

Events

Awards 
The main science-fiction Awards known at the present time did not exist at this time.

Literary releases

Novels

Stories collections

Short stories

Comics

Audiovisual outputs

Movies 
 Alraune, die Henkerstochter, genannt die rote Hanne, by Jenő Illés and Josef Klein.

See also 
 1918 in science
 1917 in science fiction
 1919 in science fiction

References

science-fiction
Science fiction by year